The speech banana is a region in which all the phonemes of the world's languages fall on an audiogram.  An audiogram is a graphical representation of a person's hearing acuity at a range of frequencies and loudness levels, and it is generally charted with frequency level (in Hertz on the x-axis and decibel level (dB) on the y-axis.  When the sounds of speech or phonemes of all known human languages are plotted on an audiogram, they cluster in a banana-shaped region known as the speech banana.

People with normal hearing acuity can also hear sounds outside of the speech banana.   These sounds include ambient natural sounds such as a rustling of leaves in the wind or birds chirping.  Artificial sounds outside of the speech banana can include music and mechanical noises (e.g., automobiles, lawn mowers).

Audiologists are primarily concerned with hearing loss that occurs within the speech banana because it can slow the development of a child’s language and speech abilities, and this in turn can profoundly interfere with learning. Hearing loss within the speech banana can also hinder communication capabilities in adults, as in elderly people with age-related hearing loss (presbycusis).

Importance of speech banana for SLT 

- The speech banana is important because it includes most of the sounds of human language which is vital 
for our communications with each other . People with normal hearing . can abo hear lots of sound's outside 
of the speech banana such as low frequency fog horns or high frequency mosquitos . 
- One use of the speech banana is for young children : even if the child has limited expressive spoken 
language , the audiogram will show what sounds within the speech banana the child can hear when using 
hearing aid or cochlear implant. this helps to get a pretty good idea of how much spoken language the child 
can understand.

References

http://web1.newpaltz.k12.ny.us/local/high_school/Teachers/swunderlich/speech_banana.htm

Audiology